Li Xiaoyun (born 16 March 1987), also known as Michelle Li, is a Chinese-born Australian singer. She is the runner-up in the 2009 Super Girl contest, and currently studies at the University of Melbourne.

Early life
Li grew up in a working family in Lanzhou, Gansu. At the age of 15, she moved to Melbourne with her mother, who runs a hot-pot restaurant. Li attended Blackburn High School and studied at the University of Melbourne.

Li likes sports. She used to be the captain and a good center of the school basketball team when she was in Lanzhou No.7 Middle School in China.

Musical talent
In her early age, Li inherited the talent for music from her father, who liked to play music in his spare time. Li's own journey in the world of music started With an old guitar given by her father. She was also influenced by so many pop stars and musicians like Wang Leehom, Jeff Chang, David Tao and Jay Chow.

Though never receiving any professional training, Li can play skillfully on guitar and piano. Her guitar skill even won professional appreciation.

Li likes to write her own song. Her first piece came out in primary school, but one of the most impressive one might be a song for her deceased father.

When Li was about to apply for the University of Melbourne, she was told that her father had been diagnosed with cancer. She held on upon the news until she was admitted by the university, and chose to suspend the schooling for a year to look after her father in China.

The song "Strength given by my father" was finished beside her dying father with a guitar. The lyric is about a girl talking cozily with her beloved and long-separated father. She assured him that she would carry on in the future with the strength he had passed to her.

Albums

References

1987 births
Living people
People from Lanzhou
Super Girl contestants
Singers from Gansu